Finna may refer to:

 Finna, a conjugation of "fixing to" common in African American Vernacular English and Southern American English
 Finna (novella), a 2020 LGBT speculative fiction novella by Nino Cipri
 , an online public access catalog held by the National Library of Finland